Gisèle Barreau (born 28 February 1948) is a French composer.

Life
Gisèle Barreau was born in Couëron, west of Nantes in Brittany, and studied with Émile Leipp and Michèle Castellengo for musical acoustics at Jussieu University. She continued her studies with Pierre Schaeffer at the Paris Conservatory and later with Olivier Messiaen. In 1977 she received a diploma in electroacoustic music from the Groupe de Recherches Musicales (GRM).

After completing her university studies, Barreau obtained a teaching certificate for music. She was composer-in-residence at the MacDowell Colony in 1978 and resident at the Villa Medici from 1980-82. Barreau works as a professor at the Paris Conservatoire.

Honors and awards
1st Prize in Harmony, Counterpoint, Fugue and Musical Analysis at the Paris Conservatoire
1st prize in musical composition, Olivier Messiaen class (1977)
Koussevitzky Composition Prize (for Tlaloc, 1977)
Composition Prize of the SACEM Georges Enescu (1978)
Award of the Ministry of Women's Rights (1986)
Prix de composition Stéphane Chapelier-Clergue (1988)
Prix SACEM Partition teaching (for Blue Rain, 2000)

Works
Selected works include:
Blue Rain for 2 pianos, 2 percussion, 1998
Océanes for orchestra, 1988
Piano-Piano for ensemble, 1982
Little Rain
Tlaloc, for two percussionists

References

1948 births
Living people
20th-century classical composers
20th-century French composers
20th-century French women musicians
French classical composers
French women classical composers
French music educators
Musicians from Nantes
Women music educators
20th-century women composers